.Perfect Songs is an independent music publishing company with a catalogue containing songs of the past 25 years.

It is part of the SPZ Group of companies, which also includes Sarm Studios (recording studios), ZTT Records, Stiff Records (record labels) and Music Bank hire (equipment hire and rehearsal studios).

Songs featured in its catalogue include "Relax" and "Two Tribes" by Frankie Goes to Hollywood – two of the best-selling pop hits of the 1980s, the Grammy Award-winning "Kiss From A Rose" by Seal, Frankie's "The Power of Love", "Dreams and Sunshine" by Gabrielle (singer), and "Beatbox", "Close (To The Edit)" and "Moments in Love" by the Art of Noise – two of the most sampled songs in history.

History 
The company was formed in 1982 by record producer Trevor Horn and manager Jill Sinclair and it has been based at the same office – Sarm Studios – ever since.  Horn's credits date back to Baby Blue, a 1979 co-write for Dusty Springfield, via hit songs of the 1980s written for Malcolm McLaren and Grace Jones to co-writes in the 2000s for Cher, Lisa Stansfield and several worldwide smash hit singles for t.A.T.u.

Among some of the most important musician Perfect has worked with, the company has signed David Jordan (singer) (whose 2007 debut album, Set The Mood, has sold over 150,000 copies), singer-songwriter Kid Harpoon, Alistair Griffin, and Tim Hutton (whose recent co-writes include Ian Brown and Sugardaddy, a partnership with Tom Findlay from Groove Armada).

Two of Perfect's most enduring songwriters were both signed as almost complete unknowns, and have since collected Grammy Awards and nominations. Seal, whose hits include "Crazy", "Kiss From A Rose", "Killer" and "Future Love Paradise"; and Marsha Ambrosius, who signed to Perfect in the very early 2000s, and has written for and in collaboration with Michael Jackson and Alicia Keys.

Perfect has also worked with Gabrielle, Mark Morrison, rapper MC Tunes, rave act Shades of Rhythm, and 808 State.

Catalogue 
A selection of songs in the Perfect Songs repertoire:
 808 State - "Pacific State"
 Alicia Keys - "Go Ahead"
 Alistair Griffin - "You And Me Tonight"
 Amy Winehouse - "Close To The Front"
 Art of Noise - "Beat Box"
 David Jordan - "Sun Goes Down"
 The Frames - "Dance The Devil Back Into His Hole"
 Frankie Goes To Hollywood - "Relax"
 Gabrielle - "Give Me A Little More Time"
 Grace Jones - "Slave To The Rhythm"
 Kid Harpoon - "Her Body Sways"
 Malcolm McLaren - "Buffalo Gals"
 Mark Morrison - "Return of The Mack"
 Mutya Buena - "Song For Mutya"
 The Pogues - "Fairytale Of New York"
 Seal - "Crazy"
 Shane MacGowan and Moya Brennan - "You're The One"
 Shane MacGowan and Sinéad O'Connor - "Haunted"
 Sugababes - "Overload"
 t.A.T.u. - "All The Things She Said"

References 
 Article from Billboard - 26 November 1988

External links 
 Perfect Songs
 SPZ Group

Music publishing companies of the United Kingdom